Cameron Nicholas Douglas McIntosh (born 2 December 1975 in Pietermaritzburg) is a South African slalom canoeist who competed from the late 1990s to the late 2000s. He attended Michaelhouse in the KwaZulu-Natal Midlands where he was Deputy Head Boy in 1994. He was eliminated in the qualifying round of the C2 event at the 2008 Summer Olympics in Beijing, finishing in 12th place.

McIntosh competed in K1 and C2 classes. His partner in the C2 boat was Cyprian Ngidi.

World Cup individual podiums

1 African Championship counting for World Cup points

References

1975 births
Sportspeople from Pietermaritzburg
Canoeists at the 2008 Summer Olympics
Living people
Olympic canoeists of South Africa
South African male canoeists
Alumni of Michaelhouse